Viktor Kalashnikov is a Russian freelance journalist and a former KGB colonel. In the autumn of 2010, he and his wife Marina Kalashnikova were treated in hospital in Germany for mercury poisoning in what they said had been an attempt on their lives by Russia's FSB, the successor to the KGB. He is a distant relative of Mikhail Kalashnikov, the inventor of the AK-47.

Personal life
He was married to Marina Kalashnikova, a former historian and journalist.

Activities
Kalashnikov and his wife have been publishing articles critical of the Kremlin since the 1990s. They left Russia and have lived in various countries, such as Ukraine, Poland, Estonia and now Germany. They claim to have been warned to cease their activities at various points in the 1990s and 2000s by KGB agents.

Poisoning and investigation
In November 2010, it was reported that the doctors at Berlin's Charité hospital had discovered that Kalashnikov who had been losing weight significantly, had 53.7 microgrammes of mercury per litre of blood, while his wife had even more - 56 microgrammes (the safe level is between one and three microgrammes). Kalashnikov told the press that "Moscow poisoned us".

The case was compared with that of another former Russian security officer, Alexander Litvinenko, who was murdered in London in 2006; he is believed to have been administered a radioactive polonium isotope. The Kalashnikovs claimed that they were poisoned in hotels and private residences in Estonia, Ukraine, Poland, Russia and Germany.

On December 28, 2010, The Times reported that its journalistic investigation had led to a preliminary criminal inquiry being opened in Berlin, which was announced on December 27, 2010.

Later, German prosecutors have dropped an investigation. Spokesman for the state prosecutor's office in Berlin told the AFP news agency: "There is no evidence that they were poisoned, at least in Germany."

See also
Karinna Moskalenko - lawyer who claims to have been poisoned with mercury by the Russian authorities

References

Living people
Year of birth missing (living people)

Russian journalists
KGB officers